The 1972 Puerto Rican general elections were held in Puerto Rico on 7 November 1972. Rafael Hernández Colón of the Popular Democratic Party (PPD) was elected Governor, whilst the PPD also won a majority of the seats in the House of Representatives and the Senate. Voter turnout was 80.4%.

Results

Governor

House of Representatives

Senate

References 

1972 elections in the Caribbean
1972
Elections
Puerto Rico